Hooked on Love may refer to:

Music

Albums
Hooked on Love, a 1987 album by Clarence Carter

Songs
 "Hooked on Love" (Dead or Alive song), from the album Mad, Bad and Dangerous to Know
 "Hooked on Love" (Grand Funk Railroad song), from the album Closer to Home
 "Hooked on Love", a song by Bananarama, from the album True Confessions
 "Hooked on Love", a song by Glenn Campbell, from the album Somethin' 'Bout You Baby I Like
 "Hooked on Love", a song by Schon & Hammer, from the album Untold Passion
 "Hooked on Love", a song by Benny Tipene, from the album Bricks
 "Hooked on Love", a song by Ian Gomm

Television
 "Hooked on Love", a season six episode of Catfish